Chitrambari (pronounced chitrāmbari) is a ragam in Carnatic music (musical scale of South Indian classical music). It is the 66th Melakarta rāgam in the 72 melakarta rāgam system of Carnatic music. It is called Chaturangini in Muthuswami Dikshitar school of Carnatic music. It is the prati madhyamam equivalent of Naganandini, which is the 30th melakarta.

Structure and Lakshana

It is the 6th rāgam in the 11th  chakra Rudra. The mnemonic name for this rāgam is Rudra-Sha. The mnemonic phrase is sa ra gu mi pa dhu nu. Its  structure (ascending and descending scale) is (see swaras in Carnatic music for details on below notation and terms):
: 
: 
(the notes in this scale are chathushruti rishabham, antara gandharam, prati madhyamam, shatshruti dhaivatam, kakali nishadam)

Since it is a melakarta rāgam, by definition it is a sampoorna rāgam (it has all 7 notes in ascending and descending scale).

Janya rāgams 
Chitrambari has a few janya rāgams (derived scales) associated with it, of which Amritavarshini is very popular. List of janya rāgams contains the full list of rāgams associated with Chitrambari and other melakartas.

Compositions
A few compositions set to Chitrambari are:

Sri rama nelami by Dr. M. Balamuralikrishna
Samaganalola by Koteeswara Iyer

Related rāgams
The theoretical and scientific aspect of Chitrambari are described below.

Chitrambari's notes when shifted using Graha bhedam, yields 3 other melakarta rāgams, namely, Shanmukhapriya, Shoolini and Dhenuka. Graha bhedam is the step taken in keeping the relative note frequencies same, while shifting the shadjam (Sa) to the next note in the rāgam. For further details and an illustration refer Graha bhedam on Shanmukhapriya.

Notes

References

Melakarta ragas